Pyrgolidium is a genus of sea snails, marine gastropod mollusks in the family Pyramidellidae, the pyrams and their allies.

Species
Species within the genus Pyrgolidium include:
 Pyrgolidium internodulum (S. V. Wood, 1848)
 Pyrgolidium josettae (Saurin, 1959)

References

 Monterosato T. A. (di) (1884). Nomenclatura generica e specifica di alcune conchiglie mediterranee. Palermo, Virzi, 152 pp

External links
 To World Register of Marine Species

Pyramidellidae